Mickley is the name of several locations in England. It may refer to:

Mickley, Derbyshire
Mickley, Northumberland
Mickley, North Yorkshire
Mickley, Shropshire